Kailangan Ko'y Ikaw is the soundtrack to the 2000 Viva Films comedy and romance film of the same name starring Regine Velasquez and Robin Padilla. The soundtrack was released by Viva Records on 2000 in CD and cassette format. With the film's immense success, the single "Kailangan Ko'y Ikaw" shot to the top of the charts and the soundtrack sold more than 240,000+ copies in the Philippines.

Content
The carrier single is the song "Kailangan Ko'y Ikaw" composed by Ogie Alcasid which was requested by Regine Velasquez to be the main love theme of the film. The song was created for only a day by Alcasid during his then wife Michelle Van Eimeren's second child pregnancy. The album went gold certified by the Philippine Association of the Record Industry (PARI) after a week upon release and turned platinum award after a month and considered one of the best selling soundtracks by a Filipino movie in the Philippines.

Accolades
The song Kailangan Ko'y Ikaw received numerous awards and citation from different Philippine awards program including Awit Awards, Filipino Academy of Movie Arts & Sciences (FAMAS) Awards and PMPC Star Awards for Movies.

Track listing

 Track 2 is a cover song from The Stylistics
 Track 3 is a cover song from Roberta Flack
 Track 4 is a cover song from APO Hiking Society
 Track 5 is a Ryan Cayabyab original and popularized by Basil Valdez
 Track 7 also features vocals from Raul Mitra
 Track 8 is a cover song from Jim Photoglo popularized by James Ingram
 Track 13 is the main theme with The Manila Philharmonic Orchestra

Personnel
The album was produced by Regine Velasquez and Raul Mitra.
Regine Velasquez – vocals, background vocals
Trina Belamide – background vocals
Sonny Azurin – bass
Roger Herrera – bass
Marc Lopez – arranger
Raul Mitra – arranger, vocals
Eric Apuyan – engineer, mixing
Eric Payumo – engineer
Percival Fontanilla – A&R
Ewan MacColl – composer
Van Sean Deato – cover design

Certifications

See also
 Regine Velasquez discography
 List of best-selling albums in the Philippines

References

Pop soundtracks
Pop compilation albums
Regine Velasquez albums
Romance film soundtracks
Comedy film soundtracks